Geovane Batista Loubo (born January 9, 1992 in Teófilo Otoni), known as Geovane, is a Brazilian footballer who plays as midfielder. He is known to have teamed with Neymar in Santos Academy. He played in Campeonato Brasileiro Série B for Mogi Mirim in 2015.

References

External links

1992 births
Living people
Brazilian footballers
Association football midfielders
Campeonato Brasileiro Série B players
América Futebol Clube (Teófilo Otoni) players
Araxá Esporte Clube players
Mogi Mirim Esporte Clube players